Budhee is an area and Municipality in Balaghat city of Madhya pradesh, India.

Ward 

 Ward no. 11
 Ward no. 12
 Ward no. 13

Schools and Institutes 

 Johnson's Kids Care English Medium School Balaghat.
 Gayatri Vidhya Mandir
 Anupam school (before- Pragya vidhya peeth)
 Kamla Higher Secondary School
 Adarsh Jyoti school, Ganganagar
 Privartan Mission school
 Methodist Mission English school
 Govt. Primary & Middle school, Dheemartola
Govt. ITI Balaghat

Gallery

References

Balaghat
Madhya Pradesh